In geometry, the augmented triangular prism is one of the Johnson solids. As the name suggests, it can be constructed by augmenting a triangular prism by attaching a square pyramid to one of its equatorial faces. The resulting solid bears a superficial resemblance to the gyrobifastigium, the difference being that the latter is constructed by attaching a second triangular prism, rather than a square pyramid.

It is also the vertex figure of the nonuniform  duoantiprism (if ). Despite the fact that  would yield a geometrically identical equivalent to the Johnson solid, it lacks a circumscribed sphere that touches all vertices.

Its dual, a triangular bipyramid with one of its 4-valence vertices truncated, can be found as cells of the  duoantitegums (duals of the  duoantiprisms).

External links
 
 

Johnson solids